Mark Pearson may refer to:

Mark Pearson (entrepreneur) (born 1980), British entrepreneur and founder of Markco Media
Mark Pearson (field hockey) (born 1987), Canadian field hockey player
Mark Pearson (footballer) (born 1939), British footballer
Mark Pearson (musician), American singer with Nielsen Pearson
Mark Pearson (politician) (born 1959), Australian politician
Mark Pearson (journalist) (1957–2012), American agricultural journalist and television personality